U.S. Route 136 is an east-west U.S. highway that is a spur route of U.S. Route 36. It runs from Edison, Nebraska, at U.S. Route 6 and U.S. Route 34 to the Interstate 74/Interstate 465 interchange in Speedway, Indiana. US 136 never meets its parent, US 36; however, it does come within two miles of it at its interchange with I-465/I-74 at its eastern terminus.

Route description

U.S. 136 passes through the following states:

Nebraska

U.S. 136 closely parallels Nebraska's southern border from its western terminus near Edison to the Missouri River.  It passes through Beatrice and exits the state at Brownville via the Brownville Bridge.  It is designated the Heritage Highway throughout Nebraska.

Missouri

US 136 enters Missouri on the west just east of Brownville, Nebraska, over the Missouri River. It leaves the state at Alexandria on the east, running concurrently with US 61. During its journey, it enters every county seat in the nine counties it traverses. US 136 is two lanes over its entire course through Missouri.

Iowa

US 136 in Iowa consists of a  route which travels across the south-easternmost tip of Lee County. East of the US 61 split, US 136 is overlapped by US 61 Bus. through Keokuk. US 136 enters Keokuk along 7th Street, which takes a turn to the northeast towards downtown. At the intersection with Main Street, which is the southern end of US 218, it turns to the southeast towards the Mississippi River. US 136 travels another  before crossing the Mississippi into Hamilton, Illinois via the Keokuk–Hamilton Bridge.

Illinois

US 136 spends  within the state of Illinois. It crosses the Mississippi River into Illinois from Iowa just past Keokuk. It passes through historic Carthage; site of the death of Joseph Smith, founder of the Latter Day Saint movement and home of the Kibbe biological museum, then Macomb, where Western Illinois University is located. It continues as an east–west route intersecting with I-155 and I-55 south of Bloomington-Normal and north of Lincoln in Central Illinois. US 136 then travels concurrently with Illinois Route 1 in far east central Illinois before entering Danville. At Danville, it turns east as it passes into Indiana.

Indiana

Through most of its duration in Indiana, US 136 is parallel to the newer I-74. Within Indianapolis, the highway is also called Crawfordsville Road, and US 136 ends in the town of Speedway, at the I-74/I-465 interchange, where Crawfordsville Road continues without numbered designation. As part of Indiana's Accelerate 465 project, the I-74/I-465 interchange was being reworked to eliminate tight spiral ramps and to add a full interchange for US 136 with I-465. It was completed in 2014. The entire portion of US 136 in Indiana is part of the Dixie Highway.

History
In Illinois, the designation of US 136 in 1951 replaced IL 10 from the Iowa state line in Keokuk to IL 119 in Havana, The route then followed IL 119 to an intersection with IL 1, where it traveled south to IL 10, heading east to Danville and the Indiana state line.

In Missouri, most of US 136 was designated as Route 4 in 1922. This highway began at St. Joseph and followed present US 169 to Stanberry, turning east there to the Iowa state line along US 136. The rest of US 136 was initially Route 1A (Nebraska to Rock Port), part of Route 1, and Route 18 (Tarkio to Stanberry). The east end was truncated to Wayland in 1926, when US 61 was designated over the part east to Iowa, and in 1927 Route 4 absorbed the former Route 52 from St. Joseph southwest to Atchison, Kansas. In 1932, Route 4 was rerouted west of Stanberry, absorbing Route 18 and Route 102 (the latter a ca. 1930 renumbering of Route 1A); the portion from Stanberry to St. Joseph was deleted in favor of US 169 and the portion from St. Joseph to Kansas became Route 18 (which became part of US 59 in 1934). US 136 replaced Route 4 east of Stanberry in 1951 and the rest in 1960.

In Nebraska, US 136 was previously "Route 3." US 136 replaced Route 3 in 1960.

US 136 was originally proposed to use I-465 in Indiana to the US 36 interchange so US 136 could meet its parent, US 36.

Major intersections
Nebraska
  north-northwest of Edison
  north-northwest of Alma. The highways travel concurrently to Alma.
  in Red Cloud
  south-southeast of Hebron
  in Beatrice
  in Auburn
Missouri
  in Rock Port
  northwest of Rock Port
  south-southwest of Tarkio. The highways travel concurrently to Tarkio.
  east-southeast of Burlington Junction. The highways travel concurrently to Maryville.
  in Stanberry. The highways travel concurrently to north-northwest of Darlington.
  southwest of Bethany. The highways travel concurrently to Bethany.
  in Bethany
  in Princeton. The highways travel concurrently through Princeton.
  south-southeast of Glenwood. The highways travel concurrently to Lancaster.
  west-northwest of Alexandria. The highways travel concurrently to Keokuk, Iowa.
Iowa
  in Keokuk
Illinois
  in Macomb. The highways travel concurrently to east of Macomb.
  in Duncan Mills. The highways travel concurrently to south of Duncan Mills.
  east-northeast of Emden
  in McLean
  in Heyworth
  south-southeast of Le Roy
  southeast of Le Roy
  in Rantoul
  in Rantoul
  in Danville
Indiana
  in Veedersburg. The highways travel concurrently through Veedersburg.
  in Crawfordsville
  on the Indianapolis–Speedway line.

See also
Illinois Route 336
List of U.S. Routes

References

External links

 Endpoints of U.S. Highway 136

 
36-1
36-1
36-1
136